The Pakistan cricket team played against Australia in England from 5–25 July 2010. The tour consisted of two T20Is and two Tests. Pakistan was the official home nation but the tour was transferred to England for security reasons.

Twenty20 Series

1st T20I

2nd T20I

Test series

1st Test

2nd Test

Tour matches

First Class: Kent vs Pakistanis

Tour match: Derbyshire vs Australians

Tour match: Leicestershire vs Pakistanis

References

External links
 Pakistan v Australia 2010 from Cricinfo

2010 in Australian cricket
2010 in English cricket
2010 in Pakistani cricket
2010
International cricket competitions in 2010
Pakistani cricket seasons from 2000–01